The qualification round of  Men's 25 metre rapid fire pistol event was held on 28 July 2014 at the Barry Buddon Shooting Centre, while the final was held on 29 July 2014 at the same place. David Chapman from Australia won the gold medal while Harpreet Singh from India Won the silver medal.

Results

Qualification

Finals

References

External links
Schedule

Shooting at the 2014 Commonwealth Games